Humiaki Huzita (Japanese: 藤田文章, Hepburn romanization: Fujita Fumiaki) was a Japanese-born, mathematician and origami artist who later became an Italian citizen. He is also a geologist and a physicist that focuses specifically on nuclear physics. He is best known for formulating the first six Huzita–Hatori axioms, which are rules associated with origami, the mathematics behind it, and the operations that form when folding a paper.

Biography and Education 
Humiaki Huzita was born in 1924 in Japan. After his basic education, he moved to Italy to attend the University of Padua. Here he studied nuclear physics and was eventually granted Italian citizenship. Though because of Japan's nationality laws, which do not allow dual citizenship, he was unable to live permanently in Japan following his retirement. Huzita, having lived in Japan and Italy, spoke both Japanese and Italian, however, he also spoke proficient English. This was advantageous for him and his cause, allowing him to spread his knowledge of origami and the geometry and mathematics behind it to a larger range of people.

Scientific Career and Contributions 
Apart from origami, Humiaki Huzita studied nuclear physics. He has several publications on these topics. Some examples include the article "On the Analysis of the Slow Particles Emitted from Cosmic-Ray Stars" written with Shigeo Nakagawa, Eiji Tamai, and Kiyoaki Okudaira. This article discusses the measured diameter of the six unique tracks of stars ending in the G5 emulsion and the insights that this information gives. Another article on the topic of physics written by Humiaki Huzita is titles "Symmetry and Symmetry Breaking in Boats, Its Propulsion Methods and Navigation Techniques." This article focusses on how symmetry breaking, or asymmetry, can sometimes be superior to symmetry even when unexpected, using boats as an example. One final example of an article by Huzita regarding nuclear physics is "Evidence of Non-Zero Mass Features for the Neutrinos Emitted at Supernova LMC-'87A."

Pertaining to his work in Origami, Huzita was rather influential. For instance, Huzita invited Tomoko Fuse to the 1987 Italian Origami Society (Centro Diffusione Origami) convention in Padua because he noticed her talent, skill, and different origami techniques. Through her attendance at the convention, she began to gain worldwide recognition in the origami community. Furthermore, Huzita also organized several conventions and meetings between origami artists and mathematicians. Huzita arranged what was called "The First International Meeting of Origami Science and Technology” at the Casa di Ludovico Ariosto in Ferrara, Italy. This meeting had many origami mathematicians and artists from around the world and bridged the gap between them. On account of Huzita's pioneering idea for "The First International Meeting of Origami Science and Technology,” many more have followed since then. In 1994, a second conference was held in Otsu, Japan, followed by one in Asilomar, California in 2001; Pasadena, California in 2006; Singapore in 2010; and Tokyo, Japan in 2014.

Death 
Humiaki Huzita died on March 26, 2005 due to an automobile accident.

References

External links 
Origami Geometric Constructions

1924 births
2005 deaths
20th-century  Italian  mathematicians
21st-century  Italian  mathematicians
Japanese emigrants to Italy
Origami